Martin Hamrlík (born May 6, 1973) is a retired Czech ice hockey player most recently with Zlin ZPS HC of the Czech Extraliga. He was drafted by the Hartford Whalers 31st overall in the 1991 NHL Entry Draft, but never played in the NHL.

Playing career
Hamrlik began his career at the age of 16 with Zlin. He played with them until he was drafted in 1991. He resumed his playing career with the Ottawa 67's of the OHL. He played one AHL game in 1993-94 with the Springfield Indians. He then played in the IHL for three teams in four years, before returning to Zlin in 1997. He played for Zlin for 18 seasons, from 1989 to 1991, and 1997 to 2013.

His younger brother Roman Hamrlík played 1395 NHL games for seven different NHL teams.

References

External links

Czech ice hockey defencemen
Hartford Whalers draft picks
Orlando Solar Bears (IHL) players
Living people
Long Beach Ice Dogs (IHL) players
Ottawa 67's players
Sportspeople from Zlín
Peoria Rivermen (IHL) players
Springfield Indians players
1973 births
Czechoslovak ice hockey defencemen
Czech expatriate ice hockey players in Canada
Czech expatriate ice hockey players in the United States